Lillian Lippeatt (born August 28, 2004) is an American artistic gymnast. She became a United States national team member in 2019 and made her international debut at the 2019 Gymnix International.

Career

Junior 
Lippeatt began gymnastics in 2007. Her first national competition was the 2015 HOPES Championships in Chicago, where she placed first on uneven bars and fifth all-around. 

In March 2017, Lippeatt competed at the Nastia Liukin Cup, placing first on floor exercise and beam, and seventh all-around. In July 2017 she competed at the US Classic, placing seventh on floor and tenth all-around. She also competed at the 2017 P&G Championships. There Lippeatt ranked 15th all-around, 25th on vault, 24th on uneven bars, 14th on balance beam and tenth on floor exercise. 

In August 2018, Lippeatt competed at the US Gymnastics Championships in Boston and placed 21st all-around. 

She joined the United States' junior national team on 24 February 2019. In March 2019, she made her international debut at Gymnix International alongside fellow American juniors Skye Blakely, Olivia Greaves and Kaylen Morgan.  The American team won the junior team final. Individually Lippeatt finished fifth all-around and won bronze on balance beam. In July 2019, she competed at the GK US Classic, placing ninth all-around. At the US Gymnastics Championships in Kansas City that August, Lippeatt finished fifth on uneven bars and floor exercise, and eighth all-around.

Senior 
Lippeatt joined the senior national team on March 3 2020. She made her senior debut on March 6-8 at Gymnix International. With teammates MyKayla Skinner, Faith Torrez and Emily Lee, she won team gold and individually placed eighth on balance beam.

References 

2004 births
Living people
American female artistic gymnasts
Sportspeople from Cincinnati
People from Mason, Ohio